Teluk Cempedak or Teluk Chempedak (literally : Cempedak Bay) also known as Palm Beach is a beach in Kuantan, Pahang, Malaysia. It is located 5 kilometres east from the town centre in Kuantan. The white sandy beach and casuarinas and pine trees line the coast, with some rocky promontories facing the South China Sea.

See also
Cherating
Tanjung Sepat, Pahang
Batu Hitam

References

Beaches of Malaysia
Landforms of Pahang
Populated places in Pahang
Towns in Pahang